Gardangah is a village in Kohgiluyeh and Boyer-Ahmad Province, Iran.

Gardangah may also refer to:
Gardangah-e Quchemi
Gardangah-e Quchemi, alternate name of Quchemi
Gardangah-e Shahali